Nikita Mikhailovich Bochkov (born 16 May 1991) is a Russian pair skater who currently represents Belarus with partner Maria Paliakova. With former partner Kristina Astakhova, he placed seventh at the 2011 World Junior Championships.

Programs

With Paliakova

With Astakhova

Competitive highlights

With Paliakova for Belarus

With Astakhova for Russia

References

External links 

 
 

Russian male pair skaters
Belarusian male pair skaters
1991 births
Living people
Figure skaters from Moscow